Pogonocherus ovatus is a species of beetle in the family Cerambycidae. It was described by Johann August Ephraim Goeze in 1777, originally under the genus Cerambyx. It has a wide distribution throughout Europe, although it has become extinct in several countries, including Luxembourg, Belgium and the Netherlands. It contains the varietas Pogonocherus ovatus var. subovatus.

P. ovatus feeds on Corylus avellana, Abies alba, Abies cephalonica, Ilex aquifolium, and Castanea sativa.

References

Pogonocherini
Taxa named by Johann August Ephraim Goeze
Beetles described in 1777